Stefan Fadinger was an Austrian farmer who, along with his brother-in-law, Christoph Zeller, was the leader of the peasants during the Peasants' War in Upper Austria. A Protestant, Fadinger opposed his Catholic Bavarian overlords, and after Adam Von Herberstorff played a "dice game" wherein many were hanged, he planned a revolt. Once the revolt began earlier than he expected, he and Zeller led the rebels to defeat the Bavarians and lay siege to Linz. During the Siege Fadinger was wounded in the chest on 28 June 1626 and died six days later on 5 July. After Zellers death on 18 July the Rebel leadership was crippled and the revolt was crushed by November 1626.

History

Fadinger was born around 1585 and was a wealthy farmer. In 1616 he took over his farm from his father. He had a wife and two children, who, after the crushing of the revolt, were forced to flee.

After Bavarian and Rebel soldiers had a skirmish at Lembach, the revolt began. Fadinger began to rally support for the protestant cause. Eventually, he was made leader of the Rebel cause, though he was somewhat overwhelmed by the position. He was supposedly a good speaker, who was able to get more for the Rebel cause, however, this, combined with his celebration after the victory at Peuerbach, would worsen said cause.

Despite being a charismatic speaker, Fadinger had little experience as a tactician, and was not particularly prepared to be the leader of the rebels. Rather than leading the army himself, he instead relied on "those which can make decisions more easily." Though Zeller successfully lead the army to victory at Peuerbach, he and Fadinger made a mistake when, rather than pursuing Herberstorff, went around attempting to gain more support for the revolt, which let Herberstorff fortify Linz.

On 28 June, Fadinger was riding around the city walls on a horse when he was spotted by Bavarian soldiers, where he was shot and fatally wounded. Fadinger died of his injuries on 5 July 1626, and ten days later, Zeller also died, thus leaving the Rebels without an effective leader, which heavily contributed to their defeat in later 1626.

References

Sources
 

Year of birth missing
1626 deaths
Austrian farmers
1580s births